Ashikaga District was a district located in Tochigi Prefecture, Japan. It was dissolved in 1962.

Former districts of Tochigi Prefecture